Besford Dorezi (born 13 August 1984) is an Albanian judoka and judo coach. He has won many national championship titles. He is also a member of the Albanian national Judo team and has participated in important international competitions. In February 2021, he was awarded with the high title "Grand Master" by President of Albania, Ilir Meta.

References

1984 births
Living people